The Great Southern and Western Railway (GS&WR) Class 52 consisted of twenty 4-4-0 express passenger tender locomotives designed by John Aspinall.  Aspinall also built a further fifteen similar but slightly larger locomotives of  GS&WR Class 60.

The locomotives were built soon after Aspinall took up his post, and were to an extent a derivation of an Alexander McDonnell 2-4-0 design incorporating the same boiler but having a leading bogie.

Improved Class 60
The Class 60 was a more powerful evolution of Class 52, being slightly heavier and having an increased tractive effort.

Service
The GSR Class 52 was initially deployed on fast express main-line services, and were almost immediately displayed to more secondary duties by the GS&WR Class 60.  The arrival of the GS&WR Class 301 and later more powerful locomotives seen them all displaced to secondary routes.  They were even known to work Dublin to Bray suburban services on very rare occasions despite their large diameter wheels being less suitable for fast acceleration.

References

4-4-0 locomotives
5 ft 3 in gauge locomotives
Railway locomotives introduced in 1883
Steam locomotives of Ireland
Scrapped locomotives